Kovachevo (also transliterated Kovačevo) may refer to three villages in Bulgaria:
 Kovachevo, Blagoevgrad  Province, a village in the Sandanski Municipality, Blagoevgrad Province
 , a village in the Septemvri Municipality, Pazardzhik Province
 Kovachevo, Stara Zagora Province, a village in the Radnevo Municipality, Stara Zagora Province

See also 
 Kovačevo (disambiguation) (Ковачево)
 Kovachevtsi (disambiguation) (Ковачевци; also translit. Kovačevci)
 Kovachevitsa (Ковачевица; also translit. Kovačevica), a village in Bulgaria
 Kovachev (Ковачев; also translit. Kovačev), a surname
 Kovach (disambiguation) (Ковач; also translit. Kovač)